Arrête ton cinéma is a 2016 French comedy film directed by Diane Kurys.

Plot 
Sybille, a recognized actress, preparing with enthusiasm her first writing film to get behind the camera. Everything seems to go well. Her producers, two sisters, are two wacky but lovable characters, and Sybille empties into the adventure with them, putting aside her family life. But, from the unlikely choice of actresses, the successive rewrites of the script, through the financial refusal, the wonderful dream turns into a nightmare. Incorrigible optimist, Sybille will realize too late that her whimsical and totally crazy producers are going to drag her in their madness ... One thing is certain, nothing will happen as planned.

Cast 
 Sylvie Testud as Sybille Teyssier
 Josiane Balasko as Brigitte
 Zabou Breitman as Ingrid
 Fred Testot as Adrien
 François-Xavier Demaison as Jack
 Claire Keim as Julie Dumas
 Hélène de Fougerolles as Marion
 Virginie Hocq as Annabelle
 Florence Thomassin as Chacha

Cameos 
 Patrick Juvet
 Michel Drucker

Production 
The film is based on the fifth book written by Sylvie Testud. The film was shot in Paris and began filming on 23 February 2015. The 11 March, a special scene was shot in the cult TV Show Vivement dimanche! host by Michel Drucker with Josiane Balasko, Sylvie Testud, Diane Kurys, Alexandre Arcady and Patrick Juvet

References

External links 

2016 comedy films
French comedy films
2016 films
Films directed by Diane Kurys
Films based on French novels
2010s French films